Charles Lucien Léandre (1862–1934) was a French caricaturist and painter. He was born at Champsecret (Orne), and studied painting under Émile Bin and Alexandre Cabanel.

Early life
Charles Lucien Léandre was born on July 22, 1864 in Champsecret. His father was the mayor of the town in which they lived until his death in 1868. At 16, Léandre met the painter Émile Bin, who would instruct Léandre. Léandre received multiple awards for his artistic talents in his twenties.

Work and career

From 1887 Léandre figured among the exhibitors of the Salon, where he showed numerous portraits and genre pictures, but his popular fame is due to his comic drawings and caricatures. The series of the "Gotha des souverains," published in Le Rire, and Léandre's other work like that seen in L'Assiette au Beurre placed him in the front rank of contemporary caricaturists.

Besides his contributions to Le Rire, Le Figaro and other comic journals, he published a series of albums: Nocturnes, Le Musée des souverains, and Paris et la province. In 1904, he created the Société des Peintres Humoristes.

Léandre produced admirable work in lithography, and designed many memorable posters, such as the "Yvette Guilbert." "Les nouveaux mariés," "Joseph Prudhomme," "Les Lutteurs," and "La Femme au chien."

He died in 1934 in his Caulaincourt street studio, in Montmartre.

Honors
Léandre won a bronze medal at the Exposition Universelle in 1889 for a large size painting: la Mère ou « Dormio cor meum vigilat » ("Je dors mais mon coeur veille"). In 1900, at the next Exposition Universelle, he was among the five lithographic artists selected to achieve two compositions on a selected theme; he received a gold medal at this contest.

He was created a knight of the Legion of Honour. In 1921, he got the Medal of Honour of the Société des artistes français, in the engraving section, one of the more important honorary awards an artist could obtain in Paris. In 1925, Charles Léandre was promoted an Officer of the Legion of Honour.

Gallery

References

External links
 Charles Léandre Museum (France)
 Illustrated snapshot  of the exhibition "Charles Léandre intime et multiple" managed by Musée de Montmartre (PARIS oct. 2007 - janvier 2008)
 Charles Léandre drawings at Fine Arts Museums of San Francisco
LeRire.com - Features OCR'd Le Rire issues
L'assiette au beurre - Another belle epoque illustrated journal.
Scènes de la vie de bohème by Henry Murger, Romagnol French edition of 1902 illustrated with etchings by  after watercolors by Charles Léandre, at Gallica Digital Library.

1862 births
1934 deaths
People from Orne
French caricaturists
19th-century French painters
French male painters
20th-century French painters
20th-century French male artists
Officiers of the Légion d'honneur
19th-century French male artists